Saint-Alban-d'Hurtières (before 2013: Saint-Alban-des-Hurtières) is a commune in the Savoie department in the Auvergne-Rhône-Alpes region in south-eastern France.

Geography

Climate

Saint-Alban-d'Hurtières has a oceanic climate (Köppen climate classification Cfb).

See also
Communes of the Savoie department

References

Communes of Savoie